Huhn is the German word for chicken. It's also a German surname. Notable people with the surname include:

Bruno Siegfried Huhn
Charlie Huhn
Clara Huhn
Emil Huhn
Franziska Huhn (born 1977), German harpist
Wolfram Huhn

See also
Hahn (disambiguation)
Haan
Hehn

German-language surnames
Surnames from nicknames